The Bride Wore Boots is a 1946 romantic comedy film with Barbara Stanwyck in the title role, playing opposite Robert Cummings. A very young Natalie Wood is seen in the film, directed by Irving Pichel.

This was Stanwyck's last feature comedy.  Some years later, she complained to columnist Hedda Hopper, "I've always got my eye out for a good comedy. Remember Ball of Fire and The Lady Eve? But they don't seem to write that kind of comedy anymore -- just a series of gags."

Plot
Sally Warren runs a horse farm, but her husband Jeff has a dislike and fear of horses. He is a Civil War historian and lecturer, which bores Sally but is very popular with local ladies who call themselves the Mason-Dixon Dames.

As a Christmas gift, Jeff tries to please his wife by buying her a horse called Albert, but her horse trainer Lance Gale, an old beau, insults Jeff about the kind of horse he picked. Sally in turn buys Jeff a desk that belonged to Jefferson Davis, but the Dames claim it's a fake and one of them, Mary Lou Medford, makes a pass at Jeff.

The next time Sally catches the same woman kissing Jeff, she sues him for divorce. Jeff ends up hiring Mary Lou as his secretary. To spite his wife, Jeff also enters Albert in the big Virginia Cup steeplechase race that Sally's always longed to win.

Albert's jockey is thrown, so Jeff reluctantly leaps into the saddle. He is thrown off repeatedly while trying in vain to catch Lance's horse in the race. But his effort impresses Sally, who reconciles with Jeff at the finish.

Cast
 Barbara Stanwyck as Sally Warren
 Robert Cummings as Jeff Warren
 Diana Lynn as Mary Lou Medford
 Patric Knowles as Lance Gale
 Robert Benchley as Uncle Tod
 Natalie Wood as Carol Warren

Production
In May 1945 Paramount announced they would make the film with Stanwyck, Cummings and Knowles.

In June 1945 Cummings announced he would follow this film with Dishonorable Discharge from a story by John Farrow for Paramount.

References

External links
 
The Bride Wore Boots at Letterbox DVD
The Bride Wore Boots at BFI

1946 films
1946 romantic comedy films
American romantic comedy films
American black-and-white films
Films directed by Irving Pichel
Films scored by Friedrich Hollaender
Films set in Richmond, Virginia
Films set in Virginia
American horse racing films
Paramount Pictures films
1940s English-language films
1940s American films